The American Rodeo is an annual event that has taken place during the first weekend in March since 2014 in Arlington, Texas.

History 
The American Rodeo or RFD-TV’s The American debuted in 2014.

Current day rodeo 
The American Rodeo is an annual western sports and entertainment experience that occurs each year at AT&T Stadium in Arlington, Texas, and represents the richest weekend event (it started as a one-day event) in all of western sports. Over the course of qualifier events across the country, competitors will all battle for what could be the biggest two-day paycheck of their careers. Owned by Teton Ridge, The American is a true open competition in format, the iconic event brings together top professional rodeo athletes and hardworking cowboys and cowgirls in a winner-take-all showdown, meant to crown the finest talent the world has to offer.

Occurring annually at AT&T Stadium the treasured Sunday event represents the richest two-day event in all of western sports. In just nine short years since its inception, The American payout earnings have rivaled that of the Kentucky Derby, with an unmatched total purse of more than $3 million in 2022.

From the preliminary rounds beginning in late February, the top competitors advance to the Qualifier Semifinals and then will compete in the “Contender Round” Finals for a chance to move on to AT&T Stadium and their chance to become a champion, earning what could be the biggest two-day paycheck of their careers.

The Top 10 athletes who make it to 2022’s final field on Sunday will be eligible for their discipline’s $100,000 prize money and will also have their shot at the bonus millions.

Events

2021 Champions
The 2021 Champions of "The Richest Weekend in Western Sports" took place the weekend of March 6 and 7.

2020 Champions
The 2020 Champions of "The Richest Weekend in Western Sports" took place the weekend of March 7 and 8.

2019 Champions
The 2019 Champions of "The Richest Weekend in Western Sports" took place the weekend of March 7 and 8.

Source:

2018 Champions 
The 2018 Champions of the World's "Richest One Day Rodeo" took place in February 2018.

Source:

References

Rodeos
Tourist attractions in Texas
2014 establishments in Texas
Recurring events established in 2014